Hadzhiev or Hadjiev or Khadjiev (Bulgarian: Хаджиев) is a Bulgarian surname derived from hajji, which originally was an honorific title given to a Muslim person who has successfully completed the Hajj to Mecca, but which was later adopted by Christian peoples as a word for pilgrim.

People
Kamen Hadzhiev (1991—), Bulgarian footballer.
Todor Hadzhiev (1881—1956), Bulgarian conductor, composer, and pianist.
Parashkev Hadzhiev (1919—1992), Bulgarian composer, son of Todor.
Zelimkhan Khadjiev (1994—), French freestyle wrestler of Chechen heritage.

Places
Hadzhievo, Bulgaria
Hadzhievtsi, North Macedonia

Bulgarian-language surnames